Harald Agger (11 April 1889 – 20 May 1954) was a Danish athlete. He competed in the men's hammer throw at the 1908 Summer Olympics.

References

External links
 

1889 births
1954 deaths
Athletes (track and field) at the 1908 Summer Olympics
Danish male hammer throwers
Olympic athletes of Denmark
People from Struer Municipality
Sportspeople from the Central Denmark Region